Mason Mastroianni is an American comic artist and the grandson of Johnny Hart, creator of the comic strips B.C. and Wizard of Id.

Mastroianni took over artist's duties on B.C. after Hart's death in 2007. "B.C. by Mastroianni and Hart", the new byline, appeared for the very first time on January 3, 2010, in newspapers.

Together with his brother, Mick, he created an original strip, Dogs of C-Kennel, in 2009. It is syndicated by Creators Syndicate.

Beginning December 14, 2015, he is also the cartoonist for Wizard of Id.

References

Living people
Year of birth missing (living people)
American cartoonists
American people of Italian descent